Fabula Magna is the third full-length studio album by German gothic metal band Coronatus. Thematically it focuses on myths, tales and legends.

Reception

The album received mixed reviews from the German musical press. Metal Hammer awarded four out of seven points in a review and cited stereotypics of the genre. The Sonic Seducer's reviewer was positive though about the mix of classic gothic metal and elements of medieval metal, a new style in Coronatus' repertoire. The overall album was criticised though for being too overloaded.

Track listing

Personnel
Carmen R. Schäfer – vocals
Lisa Lasch – vocals
Jo Lang – guitars
Aria Keramati Noori – guitars
Fabian Merkt – keyboards & programming
Todd G. Goldfinger – bass
Mats Kurth – drums

References

2009 albums
Coronatus albums
Massacre Records albums